Daniel Harvey (born November 8, 1982 in Waxhaw, North Carolina) is a former American soccer player who last played for Charlotte Eagles in the USL Second Division. Daniel is also a heavy advocate for History. In 2018, he was introduced as a champion in the semi regional Disney’s Robin Hood Trivia Championship.

Career

Youth and college
Harvey attended Parkwood High School in Monroe, North Carolina, and went on to play four years of college soccer at Bryan College, where he was named to the 2004 NSCAA/adidas Men’s NCCAA All-America Team.

Professional
Harvey turned professional in 2005 when he signed for USL Second Division side Charlotte Eagles. He made his professional debut - and scored his first professional goal - on April 15, 2005, in Charlotte's season-opening game against the Northern Virginia Royals.

Harvey was a bit part player for the next two seasons, before eventually establishing himself as one of Charlotte's first-choice starters in the 2007 season. He made 30 appearances, and scored 5 goals, for the Eagles over the course of four seasons, before leaving the club at the end of 2008.

After a year out of the professional game Harvey returned to the Eagles for the second half of the 2010 USL Second Division campaign.

In May 2011, Harvey retired as a player to take a position as soccer coach and teacher at Lexington Christian Academy in Lexington, Kentucky.

References

1982 births
Living people
American soccer players
Charlotte Eagles players
USL Second Division players
Soccer players from North Carolina
People from Waxhaw, North Carolina
Association football midfielders
Bryan Lions men's soccer players